The Masquerader is a novel by the Irish writer Katherine Cecil Thurston which was first published in 1904. It was the third most popular book in the United States that year.  A leading British politician chooses to swap places with his cousin, a journalist who is his doppelganger. This leads to a dilemma for his wife who falls in love with the double.

In 1917 the novel was turned into the play The Masquerader by John Hunter Booth. The play and the novel were adapted as the 1922 silent film The Masquerader and the 1933 sound film The Masquerader.

References

Bibliography
 Burt, Daniel S. The chronology of American literature: America's literary achievements from the Colonial Era to Modern Times. New England Publishing, 2004.

External links
 

1904 British novels
British novels adapted into films
British novels adapted into plays
Novels set in England